Strike! is a 2005 historical stage musical depicting the Winnipeg General Strike. It has been adapted into a Canadian Broadcasting Corporation radio production, a 17-minute short film, and the full-length feature film Stand!.

Content

Strike! focuses on Mike Sokolowski, a Ukrainian immigrant from Galicia who was killed by Royal North-West Mounted Police on "Bloody Saturday", 21 June 1919. The account of his life is heavily fictionalized, and is character is composited with another Ukrainian-Canadian labourer. Sokolowski begins the play as an anti-Semite who loathes so-called Jewish Bolshevism, but learns better due in part to a romantic sub-plot involving his godson Stefan (originally Myron) and his Jewish neighbour Rebecca.

Performances and adaptations

After two private workshops in 2003, a public outdoor "preview" of Strike! was performed at Old Market Square in Winnipeg on 15 May 2004. In May 2005, the full play was premiered at Rainbow Stage in Winnipeg's Kildonan Park as an independent production. The next fall, a revamped version premiered at Saskatoon's Persephone Theatre.

On 15 May 2007, a special performance at Winnipeg's Burton Cummings Theatre was recorded for national broadcast on CBC Radio. The theatre was chosen in part because it had been used as a meeting-place for labour activists prior to the 1919 strike. The radio adaptation was broadcast on Labour Day, 3 September 2007. In May 2009, an outdoor, street spectacle version of the musical premiered in front of Winnipeg City Hall—the site of the original events that inspired the musical.  Summer productions of the full-scale musical were held at the Canwest Centre for the Performing Arts in July/August 2009 and 2010. The Edmonton premiere of the musical occurred on 24 April 2013 in conjunction with Workshop West Theatre, at the Timms Centre for the Performing Arts.

Adaptations
A  interactive script/CD book based on Strike! was released by Playwrights Canada Press on 10 December 2007.

Mike's Bloody Saturday, a documentary film about the events that inspired the musical (i.e., the controversy surrounding the death of Mike Sokolowski), premiered on 7 October 2011, and was written, produced, and directed by Danny Schur—the composer/producer/co-writer of Strike!.

A 17-minute film adaptation of Strike! was produced in 2007, and was meant to solicit interest in producing a feature film—which came to be with the 2019 film Stand!.

Financing

Strike! was primarily financed by a limited partnership of investors from across Canada, with a mix of arts grants and donations from Canadian labour unions.

Cast and crew
Strike! was created by Danny Schur, who wrote the music and lyrics and co-wrote the text with Rick Chafe.

References

Sources
 Vancouver Sun: Strike! works for radio special, 27 August 2007
 The Ukrainian Weekly (Ottawa): Ukrainian Canadian's musical dramatizes Winnipeg General Strike, 5 June 2005
 Winnipeg Labour Council website: STRIKE New Musical Celebrates the Winnipeg Strike of 1919, 12 May 2005
 National Union of Public and General Sector Employees website: New musical celebrates the Winnipeg Strike of 1919, 10 April 2005

External links
 Strike! official website

Winnipeg General Strike
2005 musicals
Canadian radio dramas
Culture of Winnipeg
Ukrainian-Canadian culture in Manitoba
Jews and Judaism in Winnipeg
Plays set in Canada
Plays based on actual events
Plays set in the 1910s
Canadian musicals
Works about law in Canada